Woodcarver (April 9, 1996 - September 10, 1999) was a Canadian Thoroughbred racehorse who in 1999 won Canada's most important race, the Queen's Plate, and was voted the Sovereign Award as that year's Canadian Champion 3-Year-Old Colt.

Bred by Gus Schickedanz at his farm near Nobleton, Ontario, Woodcarver was raced by his owner. His sire was Woodman, a Champion 2-year-old colt in Ireland who was a son of the influential American Champion sire, Mr. Prospector. Woodman also sired Preakness and Belmont Stakes winner Hansel as well as Breeders' Cup Juvenile and Preakness Stakes winner, Timber Country.

Trained and ridden by future Hall of Fame inductees, Woodcarver was race conditioned by Michael Keogh and had Mickey Walls aboard for his wins in the Queenston Stakes and the Queen's Plate.

On September 10, 1999, Woodcarver had to be humanely euthanized after taking a misstep during a morning workout which resulted in a badly broken leg.

Pedigree

References

1996 racehorse births
1999 racehorse deaths
Thoroughbred racehorses
Racehorses bred in Canada
Racehorses trained in Canada
Canadian racehorses
Thoroughbred family 25